The Naïade-class submarines, sometimes referred to as the Perle class were a group of submarines built for the French Navy  at the beginning of the 20th century. There were twenty vessels in this class, which was designed by Gaston Romazotti. The class introduced internal combustion engines into French submarine design. They remained in service until just prior to the outbreak of the First World War.

Design and description
The Naïades were designed by Gaston Romazotti, an early French submarine engineer and director of the Arsenal de Cherbourg. They were of a single-hull design, following most previous French submarine designs, but with dual propulsion. The hull was constructed of Roma-bronze, a copper alloy devised by Romazotti to resist corrosion and reduce interference with the boat's magnetic compass; it was also believed to offer more flexibility at depth. The Naïade design was based on the first French submarine, . The submarines had a heavy lead keel for stability when submerged.

The Naïade class were armed with two single  torpedoes located externally in Drzewiecki drop collars. These were the first French submarines to incorporate an internal combustion engine into their design.

Assessment
The Naïades were smaller than Romazotti's previous  and s, smaller in fact than any French submarine to that date except the pioneering Gymnote. They were considered good surface boats, with good maneuverability but erratic when submerged.

Ships in class

Service history
The Naïades were ordered as part of the French Navy's 1900 building programme, and were constructed over the next five years at the naval dockyards at Toulon, Rochefort and Cherbourg. The entire class was assigned for service in the Mediterranean Sea apart from the three submarines constructed at Cherbourg which served in the English Channel.

By 1905, they had been reclassified as harbour defence boats. They remained in service until just prior to the outbreak of the First World War, but by then had been superseded by more modern designs and all were stricken by mid-1914. The wreck of Alose which was scuttled during an aerial bombing exercise in 1918, was discovered and raised in May 1975. The vessel is preserved as a museum piece at the headquarters of COMEX (the Compagnie Maritime d'Expertises) in Marseilles and was declared a French national historic site in 2008.

See also
 List of submarines of France

Notes

Citations

References

 
 
 
 
 

 
Submarine classes
Ship classes of the French Navy